Chucándiro is a municipality in the state of Michoacán, Mexico. It has a population of 1,609, 727 people were male, 882 were female. 999 people in the town were literate, 192 people were illiterate. The majority of people in the town are Roman Catholic. 1,531 of the people are Roman Catholic, 36 are Protestant, only 9 have no religion.

See also
Municipalities of Michoacán

References

Municipalities of Michoacán